Kilpin Pike is a village in the East Riding of Yorkshire, England.

The village forms part of the civil parish of Kilpin.

In 1823 Kilpin Pike was in the parish of Howden and the Wapentake and Liberty of Howdenshire. Occupations at the time included two shopkeepers, a butcher, a coal merchant, and the landlords of the Blue Bell and Admiral Nelson public houses.

References

Villages in the East Riding of Yorkshire